The Shire of Buln Buln was a local government area about  east-southeast of Melbourne, the state capital of Victoria, Australia.

History

Buln Buln was first incorporated as a shire on 20 September 1878. Its eastern part split away on 9 December 1881, to form the Shire of Warragul (Warragul was proclaimed a rural city in 1990), while its southern part split away on 29 May 1891, to form the Shire of Korumburra. Parts in its southwest, around the town of Lang Lang, were annexed to the Shire of Cranbourne on 21 March 1892 and 27 January 1893.

A comprehensive history of the shire, Buln Buln, was written by Graeme Butler in 1979.

On 2 December 1994, the Shire of Buln Buln was abolished, and along with the Rural City of Warragul, the Shire of Narracan, and parts of the Shire of Upper Yarra, was merged into the newly created Shire of Baw Baw.

Wards

The Shire of Buln Buln was divided into four ridings on 30 April 1958, each of which elected three councillors:

 Neerim Riding
 North Drouin Riding
 South Drouin Riding
 Longwarry Riding

Towns and localities
 Drouin*
 Drouin South
 Drouin West
 Hallora
 Icy Creek
 Jindivick
 Labertouche
 Lardner
 Longwarry
 Mountain View
 Nayook
 Neerim South
 Noojee
 Poowong East
 Ripplebrook
 Tarago

* Council seat.

Population

* Estimate in the 1958 Victorian Year Book.

References

External links
 Victorian Places - Buln Buln Shire

Buln Buln